ONE Championship rankings, which were introduced in April 2020, are generated by a voting panel made up of media members. These media members are asked to vote for whom they feel are the top fighters in ONE Championship by weight class from Mixed martial arts, Kickboxing and Muay Thai.

Background
ONE Championship’s official athlete rankings are determined by an independent panel of sports media members and industry experts following each event. The panel ranks the athletes on criteria including wins and losses, their most recent performances, and quality of competition.

The committee voted for each event consisting will include the following members of the media:
 Nicolas Atkin – South China Morning Post
 Stewart Fulton – MMA in Japan
 Manabu Takashima – MMAPLANET
 Tom Taylor – BJPenn.com
 Alan Dawson – Insider Inc.
 James Goyder – AsianMMA.com
 JM Siasat – GMA Network
 Nissi Icasiano – International Business Times
 Leon Jennings – Asian Persuasion MMA
 Ian Shutts – LowKickMMA
 Sazali Abdul Aziz – The Straits Times
 Dylan Bowker – Sportskeeda
 Wanlop Sawasdee – MGR Online
 Worapath Arunpakdee – Thairath TV
 Poptorn Roongsamai – Champ Magazine 
Rounding out the panel are former athletes Rich Franklin, Adam Kayoom, and Ann Osman.

Overview
The rankings for the ONE's fighters are both recorded and updated when information has been obtained from the ONE's website.
Last Updated: March 6, 2023

Lightweight

Featherweight

Featherweight Kickboxing

Featherweight Muay Thai

Bantamweight

Bantamweight Kickboxing

Bantamweight Muay Thai

Flyweight

Flyweight Kickboxing

Flyweight Muay Thai

Strawweight

Strawweight Muay Thai

Women's Atomweight

See also
 List of undefeated mixed martial artists
 List of current ONE fighters
 List of ONE Championship champions

References

External links 
 

ONE
Kickboxing-related lists
Mixed martial arts lists
Rankings